David Bek is a 1944 Soviet biographical adventure and drama film directed by Hamo Beknazarian and starring Hrachia Nersisyan, Avet Avetisyan and Hasmik The film is about Davit Bek, an Armenian nobleman and revolutionary and is based on the novel David Bek by Raffi (1882).

Cast 
Hrachia Nersisyan as Davit Bek
Avet Avetisyan
Hasmik
Yevgeny Samoylov
Arus Asryan
Grigor Avetyan
L. Zohrabyan
Murad Kostanyan
David Malyan
T. Ayvazyan
Vaghinak Marguni
Frunze Dovlatyan
Tatyana Makhmuryan
L. Shahparonyan
Vladimir Yershov
Evgeniy Samoylov
Lev Sverdlin
Ivane Perestiani
Arman Kotikyan
H. Stepanyan
D. Pogosyan

References

External links
 

1944 films
1940s biographical films
Soviet biographical films
1940s historical adventure films
Soviet historical adventure films
Films directed by Hamo Beknazarian
Soviet black-and-white films
Films set in Armenia
Films set in the 1720s
Soviet-era Armenian films
Armenfilm films
Cultural depictions of Davit Bek
Armenian adventure films